The Women's Reservation Bill or The Constitution (108th Amendment) Bill, 9 th March, 2010, is a bill passed in the Parliament of India which says to amend the Constitution of India to reserve 1/3 of all seats in the lower house of Parliament of India, the Lok Sabha, and in all state legislative assemblies for women. The seats were proposed to be reserved in rotation and would have been determined by draw of lots in such a way that a seat would be reserved only once in three consecutive general elections.

The Rajya Sabha passed the bill on 9 March 2010. However, the Lok Sabha never voted on the bill. The bill lapsed since it was still pending in Lok Sabha and the Lok Sabha expired during this two times in 2014 and 2019.

Women's reservation
In 1993, a constitutional amendment was passed in India that called for a random one third of village council leader, or sarpanch, positions in gram panchayat, to be reserved for women.

There is a long-term plan to extend this reservation to parliament and legislative assemblies.

See also
 Law in India
Sexual Harassment of Women at Workplace (Prevention, Prohibition and Redressal) Act, 2013

 Women in India

 Domestic violence in India
 Dowry system in India
 Female foeticide in India
 Gender inequality in India
 Gender pay gap in India
 Men's rights movement in India
 National Commission for Women
 Rape in India
 Welfare schemes for women in India
 Women in India
 Women in Indian Armed Forces
 Women's suffrage in India

References

Reservation in India
Proposed laws of India
2010 in India
2010 in law
Manmohan Singh administration
Women's rights in India
Amendments of the Constitution of India
Identity politics in India
 
2010 in women's history